Leudal (Limburgish: Leudaal) is a municipality in the Dutch province of Limburg. It was formed on January 1, 2007 in a merger of the municipalities of Heythuysen, Haelen, Hunsel, and Roggel en Neer.

Population centres 
The municipality contains the following population centres:

Topography

Dutch Topographic map of the municipality of Leudal, June 2015

Notable people 

 Arnold II of Horne (1339 – 1389) Bishop of Utrecht 1371/1378 and Bishop of Liège 1378/1389 
 Philip de Montmorency, Count of Horn (ca.1524 – 1568) a victim of the Inquisition in the Spanish Netherlands
 Floris of Montmorency  (ca.1528 - 1570) a noble and diplomat from the Spanish Netherlands
 Wilhelmus Demarteau (1917 in Horn – 2012) Bishop in the Roman Catholic Diocese of Banjarmasin,  Indonesia
 Peter J. Peters (born 1957 in Hunsel) a professor of nanobiology, works on electron microscopy
 Carool Kersten (born 1964 in Haelen) a historian of Islam, academic and author
 Stevie Ann (born 1986 in Roggel) a Dutch singer-songwriter

Sport 
 Antonius Bouwens (1876 in Hunsel – 1963) a Dutch sports shooter, bronze medallist at the 1900 Summer Olympics
 Peter van de Ven (born 1961 in Hunsel) a former professional footballer with 417 club caps
 Bart Brentjens (born 1968 in Haelen) a Dutch racing cyclist in mountain biking, gold medallist in the 1996 Summer Olympics and bronze medallist in the 2004 Summer Olympics
 Edwin Linssen (born 1980 in Neeritter) a former professional footballer with over 450 club caps
 Bryan Linssen (born 1990 in Neeritter) a Dutch professional footballer, with approaching 300 club caps

Gallery

References

External links

Official website

 
Municipalities of Limburg (Netherlands)
Municipalities of the Netherlands established in 2007